Jawahar Navodaya Vidyalaya, South Sikkim or locally known as JNV Ravangla is a boarding, co-educational  school in South Sikkim district of Sikkim state in India. Navodaya Vidyalayas are funded by the Indian Ministry of Human Resources Development and administered  by Navodaya Vidyalaya Smiti, an autonomous body under the ministry. Navodaya Vidyalayas offer free education to talented children from Class VI to XII.

History 
The school was established in 1988, and is a part of Jawahar Navodaya Vidyalaya schools. The school shifted to its permanent campus in 2000. This school is administered and monitored by Shillong regional office of Navodaya Vidyalaya Smiti.

Admission 
Admission to JNV Ravangla at class VI level is made through selection test conducted by Navodaya Vidyalaya Smiti. The information about test is disseminated and advertised in district by the office of South Sikkim district magistrate (Collector), who is also the chairperson of Vidyalya Management Committee.

Affiliations 
JNV South Sikkim is affiliated to Central Board of Secondary Education with affiliation number 1840003.

See also 
 Jawahar Navodaya Vidyalaya, West Sikkim
 List of JNV schools

References

External links 

 Official website of JNV South Sikkim

High schools and secondary schools in Sikkim
South Sikkim
Educational institutions established in 1988
1988 establishments in Sikkim